Anne Hänninen (born 7 February 1958 in Rautalampi) is a Finnish poet, essayist, and writer. She studied literature and journalism. Hänninen has mostly written poetry.

Hänninen's poetry "started by denouncing the possibility of living according to a rational order". Her work has been published in several anthologies, and has been translated into Swedish, English, Russian and Icelandic.

Selected works

Awards
Finland Province Writers Award, 1991
Kalevi Jäntti Prize, 1992
Korpi Rastas Award, 1992
Häme Art Prize, 2000
WSOY Award, 2005

References

1958 births
Living people
People from Rautalampi
Finnish women poets
Finnish women essayists
Finnish essayists
20th-century Finnish poets
20th-century essayists
21st-century Finnish poets
21st-century essayists
20th-century Finnish women writers
21st-century Finnish women writers